The 5 O'Clock Show  is a daytime television chat show on Channel 4, replacing The Paul O'Grady Show. The format was along the same lines as O'Grady's show and consisted of a mixture of celebrity guests, comic stunts and musical performances. Monday to Wednesday's shows tended to be broadcast live, while Thursday and Friday were recorded on Tuesday and Wednesday. The show was broadcast from Studio 3 of The London Studios. The show was axed by Channel 4 on 7 September 2010.

History
Originally Peter Andre was supposed to be the full-time presenter, but due to other commitments he was unable to fill all the slots.  Channel 4 decided to change the format, to have a range of guest hosts filling in. Starting with Lenny Henry's stint, the show's title was altered to Presenter's 5 O'Clock Show.

Guest presenters
Each week the show was hosted by guest presenters.

Sponsors
The 5 O'Clock Show with was sponsored by Anglian Windows.

References

External links

http://www.lostintv.com

British television talk shows
Channel 4 original programming
2010s British television talk shows
2010 British television series debuts
2010 British television series endings
English-language television shows